Bassaniodes is a genus of crab spiders that was first described by Reginald Innes Pocock in 1903.

Species
 it contains thirty-nine species and one subspecies, found in Africa, Europe, and Asia:
Bassaniodes adzharicus (Mcheidze, 1971) – Georgia
Bassaniodes anatolicus (Demir, Aktaş & Topçu, 2008) – Turkey
Bassaniodes blagoevi Naumova, 2020 – Albania
Bassaniodes bliteus (Simon, 1875) – Mediterranean
Bassaniodes bufo (Dufour, 1820) – Mediterranean
Bassaniodes canariensis (Wunderlich, 1987) – Canary Is.
Bassaniodes caperatoides (Levy, 1976) – Israel
Bassaniodes caperatus (Simon, 1875) – Mediterranean, Turkey, Ukrain, Russia (Caucasus)
Bassaniodes clavulus (Wunderlich, 1987) – Canary Is.
Bassaniodes cribratus (Simon, 1885) – Mediterranean, Russia (Europe), Turkey, Caucasus, Iran, China, Korea
Bassaniodes dolpoensis (Ono, 1978) – Nepal, China
Bassaniodes egenus (Simon, 1886) – West Africa
Bassaniodes falx (Wunderlich, 2022) – Canary Is.
Bassaniodes ferus (O. Pickard-Cambridge, 1876) – Cyprus, Egypt, Israel
Bassaniodes fienae (Jocqué, 1993) – Spain
Bassaniodes fuerteventurensis (Wunderlich, 1992) – Canary Is.
Bassaniodes graecus (C. L. Koch, 1837) – Balkans, Greece, Ukraine, Russia (Europe), Turkey, Israel, Iraq
Bassaniodes grohi (Wunderlich, 1992) – Madeira
Bassaniodes hariaensis (Wunderlich, 2022) – Canary Is.
Bassaniodes lalandei (Audouin, 1826) – Mediterranean, Azerbaijan
Bassaniodes lanzarotensis (Wunderlich, 1992) – Canary Is., Savage Is.
Bassaniodes loeffleri (Roewer, 1955) – Greece, Turkey, Caucasus, Iran, Kazakhstan, Central Asia
Bassaniodes madeirensis (Wunderlich, 1992) – Madeira
Bassaniodes obesus (Thorell, 1875) – Ukraine, Russia (Europe)
Bassaniodes ovadan (Marusik & Logunov, 1995) – Turkmenistan
Bassaniodes ovcharenkoi (Marusik & Logunov, 1990) – Central Asia
Bassaniodes pinocorticalis (Wunderlich, 1992) – Canary Is.
Bassaniodes pseudorectilineus (Wunderlich, 1995) – Greece, Turkey
Bassaniodes rectilineus (O. Pickard-Cambridge, 1872) – Syria, Lebanon, Israel, Iran
Bassaniodes robustus (Hahn, 1832) – Europe to Central Asia
Bassaniodes sardiniensis (Wunderlich, 1995) – Italy (Sardinia)
Bassaniodes sinaiticus (Levy, 1999) – Egypt
Bassaniodes socotrensis Pocock, 1903 (type) – Yemen (Socotra)
Bassaniodes squalidus (Simon, 1883) – Canary Is., Madeira
Bassaniodes tenebrosus (Šilhavý, 1944) – East Mediterranean
Bassaniodes t. ohridensis (Šilhavý, 1944) – North Macedonia
Bassaniodes tristrami (O. Pickard-Cambridge, 1872) – Greece, Turkey, Caucasus, Russia (Europe) to Central Asia, Middle East
Bassaniodes turlan (Marusik & Logunov, 1990) – Central Asia
Bassaniodes ulkan (Marusik & Logunov, 1990) – Russia (Europe), Kyrgyzstan
Bassaniodes xizangensis (Tang & Song, 1988) – China

See also
 List of Thomisidae species

References

Further reading

Thomisidae genera
Spiders of Asia
Taxa named by R. I. Pocock
Thomisidae